Garus-e Sofla (also Romanized as Garūs-e Soflá; also known as Garūs and Garūs-e Pā’īn) is a village in Sahneh Rural District, in the Central District of Sahneh County, Kermanshah Province, Iran. At the 2006 census, its population was 155, in 40 families.

References 

Populated places in Sahneh County